Tarkaris are a spicy vegetable curry, originating from the Indian subcontinent; notably in Bangladesh, India, Pakistan and Nepal. Preparation methods for tarkaris range from simple to complex.  These curries made from vegetables are popular in large parts of the Indian subcontinent, Mauritius, Fiji, South Africa, and in the Caribbean.

Gallery

See also
 List of vegetable dishes

References

Bangladeshi cuisine
Bengali cuisine
Bihari cuisine
Indian curries
Nepalese curries
North Indian cuisine
Pakistani curries
Vegetable dishes